Boondoggle is an American comedy web series loosely based on the life of actor Ty Burrell.

Premise
A struggling boss named Henry finally lands a successful series. He and his best friends, 40-something husbands and fathers, reap the benefits of his TV stardom.

Development and production
In November 2014, Ty Burrell signed an overall deal with 20th Century Fox Television to develop his own comedy projects. Working with friends Johnny Meeks, Joel Spence and Mel Cowan, performers he knew from his time with Upright Citizens Brigade, they developed Boondoggle.

Reception
The series debuted on ABC.com and web platform ABCd in June 2016. In September 2016, Backstage named it one of the "11 web series you should know about" and called it "rollicking good fun." Ty Burrell was nominated for the Primetime Emmy Award for Outstanding Actor in a Short Form Comedy or Drama Series.

References

External links
 Official website

2016 web series debuts
American comedy web series
ABC.com original programming